Pope Celestine V (1215 – 19 May 1296), born Pietro Angelerio (according to some sources Angelario, Angelieri, Angelliero, or Angeleri), also known as Pietro da Morrone, Peter of Morrone, and Peter Celestine, was head of the Catholic Church and ruler of the Papal States for five months from 5 July to 13 December 1294, when he resigned. He was also a monk and hermit who founded the order of the Celestines as a branch of the Benedictine order.

He was elected pope in the Catholic Church's last non-conclave papal election, ending a two-year impasse. Among the few edicts of his to remain in force was the confirmation of the right of the pope to resign; nearly all of his other official acts were annulled by his successor, Boniface VIII. On 13 December 1294, a week after issuing the decree, Celestine resigned, stating his desire to return to his humble, pre-papal life. He was subsequently imprisoned by Boniface in the castle of Fumone in the Lazio region, in order to prevent his potential installation as antipope. He died in prison on 19 May 1296 at the age of 81.

Celestine was canonized on 5 May 1313 by Pope Clement V. No subsequent pope has taken the name Celestine.

Early life

Pietro Angelerio was born to parents Angelo Angelerio and Maria Leone in a town called Sant'Angelo Limosano, in the Kingdom of Sicilia (Sicily). Sant'Angelo Limosano is now part of Provincia di Campobasso, in Molise, Italy.

After his father's death he began working in the fields. His mother Maria was a key figure in Pietro's spiritual development: she imagined a different future for her deeply beloved son than becoming just a farmer or a shepherd. From the time he was a child, he showed great intelligence and love for others. He showed an extraordinary disposition toward asceticism and solitude, and in 1239 retired to a solitary cavern on the Montagne del Morrone, hence his name (Peter of Morrone). Five years later he left this retreat, and went with two companions to a similar cave on the even more remote Maiella mountain in the Abruzzi region of central Italy, where he lived as strictly as possible according to the example of John the Baptist. Accounts exist of the severity of his penitential practices.

Founding of the Celestines

While living like this, in 1244, he founded the order subsequently named after him, the Celestines. A new religious community was formed, and Pietro gave them a rule formulated in accordance with his own practices. In 1264 the new institution was approved by Urban IV. Having heard that it was probable that Pope Gregory X, then holding a council at Lyon, would suppress all such new orders as had been founded since the Lateran Council had commanded that such institutions should not be further multiplied, Pietro went to Lyon. There he succeeded in persuading Gregory to approve his new order, making it a branch of the Benedictines and following the rule of Saint Benedict, but adding to it additional severities and privations. Gregory took it under papal protection, assured to it the possession of all property it might acquire, and endowed it with exemption from the authority of the ordinary. Nothing more was needed to ensure the rapid spread of the new association and Pietro lived to see himself as "superior-general" to thirty-six monasteries and more than six hundred monks. Pietro, however, cannot be accused of ambition or the lust of power when a monastic superior, any more than when he insisted on divesting himself of the papacy, to which he was subsequently raised.

As soon as he had seen his new order thus consolidated he gave up the government of it to a certain Robert, and retired once again to a still more remote solitude to give himself up more entirely to solitary penance and prayer. Shortly afterwards, in a chapter of the order held in 1293, the original monastery of Majella being judged to be too desolate and exposed to too rigorous a climate, it was decided that Abbazia Morronese in the plains of Sulmona should be the headquarters of the order and the residence of the general-superior, as it continued to be until the order was extinguished in the 19th century.

Election as pope

The cardinals assembled at Perugia after the death of Pope Nicholas IV in April 1292. After more than two years, a consensus had still not been reached. Pietro, well known to the cardinals as a Benedictine hermit, sent the cardinals a letter warning them that divine vengeance would fall upon them if they did not quickly elect a pope. Latino Malabranca, the aged and ill Dean of the College of Cardinals cried out, "In the name of the Father, the Son, and the Holy Spirit, I elect brother Pietro di Morrone!" The cardinals promptly ratified Malabranca's desperate decision. When sent for, Pietro obstinately refused to accept the papacy, and even, as Petrarch says, tried to flee, until he was finally persuaded by a deputation of cardinals accompanied by the king of Naples and the pretender to the throne of Hungary. Elected on 5 July 1294, at age 79, he was crowned at Santa Maria di Collemaggio in the city of Aquila in the Abruzzo on 29 August, taking the name Celestine V.

Papacy
Shortly after assuming office, Celestine issued a papal bull granting a rare plenary indulgence to all pilgrims visiting Santa Maria di Collemaggio through its holy door on the anniversary of his papal coronation. The Celestinian forgiveness (Perdonanza Celestiniana) festival is celebrated in L'Aquila every 28–29 August in commemoration of this event.

With no political experience, Celestine proved to be an especially weak and ineffectual pope. He held his office in the Kingdom of Naples, out of contact with the Roman Curia and under the complete power of King Charles II. He appointed the king's favorites to Church offices, sometimes several to the same office. One of these was Louis of Toulouse, whom Celestine ordered given clerical tonsure and minor orders, although this was not carried out. He renewed a decree of Pope Gregory X that had established stringent rules for papal conclaves after a similarly prolonged election. In one decree, he appointed three cardinals to govern the Church during Advent while he fasted, which was again refused.

Realizing his lack of authority and personal incompatibility with papal duties, he consulted with Cardinal Benedetto Caetani (his eventual successor) about the possibility of resignation. This resulted in one final decree declaring the right of resignation. He promptly exercised this right, resigning on 13 December 1294, after five months and eight days as pope. In the formal instrument of renunciation, he recited as the causes moving him to the step: "The desire for humility, for a purer life, for a stainless conscience, the deficiencies of his own physical strength, his ignorance, the perverseness of the people, his longing for the tranquility of his former life". Having divested himself of every outward symbol of papal dignity, he slipped away from Naples and attempted to retire to his old life of solitude.

The next pope to resign of his own accord was Gregory XII in 1415 (to help end the Western Schism), followed by Benedict XVI in 2013, 719 years later.

Retirement, death, and canonization

The former Celestine, now reverted to Pietro Angelerio, was not allowed to become a hermit once again. Various parties had opposed his resignation and the new Pope Boniface VIII had reason to worry that one of them might install him as an antipope. To prevent this he ordered Pietro to accompany him to Rome. Pietro escaped and hid in the woods before attempting to return to Sulmona to resume monastic life. This proved impossible, and Pietro was captured after an attempt to flee to Dalmatia was thwarted when a tempest forced his ship to return to port. Boniface imprisoned him in the castle of Fumone near Ferentino in Lazio, attended by two monks of his order, where Pietro died after 10 months at about the age of 81. His supporters spread the allegation that Boniface had treated him harshly and ultimately executed Pietro, but there is no clear historical evidence of this. Pietro was buried at Ferentino, but his body was subsequently moved to the Basilica of Santa Maria di Collemaggio in L'Aquila.

Philip IV of France, who had supported Celestine and bitterly opposed Boniface, nominated Celestine for sainthood following the election of Pope Clement V. The latter signed a decree of dispensation on 13 May 1306 to investigate the nomination. He was canonized on 5 May 1313 after a consistory in which Boniface's Caetani family was outvoted by members of the rival Colonna family.

Legacy

Most modern interest in Celestine V has focused on his resignation. He was the first pope to formalize the resignation process and is often said to have been the first to resign; in fact he was preceded in this by Pontian (235), John XVIII (1009), Benedict IX (1045), and Gregory VI (1046). As noted above, Celestine's own decision was brought about by mild pressure from the Church establishment. His reinstitution of Gregory X's conclave system established by the papal bull Ubi periculum has been respected ever since.

A 1966 visit by Pope Paul VI to Celestine's place of death in Ferentino along with his speech in homage of Celestine prompted speculation that the Pontiff was considering retirement.

Celestine's remains survived the 2009 L'Aquila earthquake with one Italian spokesman saying it was "another great miracle by the pope". They were then recovered from the basilica shortly after the earthquake. While inspecting the earthquake damage during a 28 April 2009 visit to the Aquila, Pope Benedict XVI visited Celestine's remains in the badly damaged Santa Maria di Collemaggio and left the woolen pallium he wore during his papal inauguration in April 2005 on his glass casket as a gift. Benedict XVI would go on to become the first pope since Celestine to voluntarily resign of his own initiative.

To mark the 800th anniversary of Celestine's birth, Pope Benedict XVI proclaimed the Celestine year from 28 August 2009 through 29 August 2010. Benedict XVI visited the Sulmona Cathedral, near Aquila, on 4 July 2010 as part of his observance of the Celestine year and prayed before the altar consecrated by Celestine containing his relics on 10 October 1294.

His entry in the Martyrologium Romanum for 19 May reads as follows:

In literature

A persistent tradition identifies Celestine V as the nameless figure Dante Alighieri sees among those in the antechamber of Hell, in the enigmatic verses:

The first commentators to make this identification included Dante's son Jacopo Alighieri, followed by Graziolo Bambaglioli in 1324. The identification is also considered probable by recent scholars (e.g., Hollander, Barbara Reynolds, Simonelli, Padoan). Petrarch was moved to defend Celestine vigorously against the accusation of cowardice and some modern scholars (e.g., Mark Musa) have suggested Dante may have meant someone else (Esau, Diocletian and Pontius Pilate have been variously suggested).

In 1346, Petrarch declared in his De vita solitaria that Celestine's refusal was a virtuous example of solitary life.

Pope Celestine V is referenced in Chapter 88 of Dan Brown's Angels & Demons, where he is controversially referenced as an example of a murdered pope. Brown writes that an X-ray of his tomb "revealed a ten-inch nail driven into the Pope's skull." While the reference to the X-ray is fictitious (no X-ray has ever been conducted on Celestine's tomb), it has been indeed alleged that Celestine was murdered, possibly by order of his successor, Pope Boniface VIII; however, there is no historical evidence of this.

The life of Pope Celestine V is dramatised in the plays L'avventura di un povero cristiano (The Story of a Humble Christian) by Ignazio Silone in 1968 and Sunsets and Glories by Peter Barnes in 1990.

His life is the subject of the short story Brother of the Holy Ghost in Brendan Connell's short story collection The Life of Polycrates and Other Stories for Antiquated Children.

Celestine V is the subject of Stefania Del Monte's book Celestino V. Papa Templare o Povero Cristiano?, published in 2009 and translated into English under the title The Story and Legacy of Celestine V in 2010.

He is the subject of a popular history by author Jon M. Sweeney, The Pope Who Quit: A True Medieval Tale of Mystery, Death, and Salvation, published by Image Books/Random House in 2012. In 2013, HBO optioned the film rights.

Celestine V is the subject of the poem "Che Fece...Il Gran Rifiuto" by the modern Greek poet Constantine P. Cavafy.

See also

 Illiterate popes
 List of Catholic saints
 List of popes

References

External links

A short video outlining the life of Pope Celestine V.
Pictures of Pope Benedict XVI's visit to the tomb of Celestine V 
Colonnade Statue in St Peter's Square

Popes
1215 births
1296 deaths
People from Molise
Italian Benedictines
Italian hermits
Benedictine popes
Non-cardinals elected pope
Italian popes
Founders of Catholic religious communities
Popes who abdicated
Italian Roman Catholic saints
Papal saints
13th-century Christian saints
13th-century popes
Celestine Order